The Aiguille du Plan (3,673 m) is a mountain in the Mont Blanc massif in the French Alps. Its needle-like summit lies in the centre of the Chamonix Aiguilles when viewed from Chamonix.

External links 
The Aiguille du Plan on Summitpost

Alpine three-thousanders
Mountains of the Alps
Mountains of Haute-Savoie
Mont Blanc massif